"It's the Pee" is the second and final single released from PMD's second album, Business Is Business. It peaked at 82 on Billboard's Hot R&B/Hip-Hop Singles & Tracks.

Single track listing
"It's The Pee '97" (Radio)- 3:07  
"Many Often Wonder" (Radio)- 2:59  
"Knick Knack Part 2" (Radio)- 3:23  
"Kool Kat" (Radio/Clean)- 4:37  
"It's The Pee '97" (Instrumental)- 3:07  
"It's The Pee 97" (Street)- 3:08  
"Many Often Wonder" (Street)- 2:59  
"Knick Knack Part 2" (Street)- 3:24  
"Kool Kat" (Album Version) 4:37  
"Many Often Wonder" (Instrumental) 2:52

1997 singles
PMD (rapper) songs
Mobb Deep songs
Song recordings produced by Havoc (musician)
Songs written by PMD (rapper)
Relativity Records singles